Sri Lanka A cricket team played 3 first-class matches and 3 List A matches against Bangladesh A cricket team in June and July 2018.

Sri Lanka A won the First class series 1–0. The List A series was drawn 1-1.

Squads

First class series

1st Unofficial Test

2nd Unofficial Test

3rd Unofficial Test

List A series

1st Unofficial ODI

2nd Unofficial ODI

3rd Unofficial ODI

Notes

References 

A team cricket
Sri Lankan cricket tours of Bangladesh